A list of films produced by the film industry of Assam based in Guwahati, India and publicly released in the decade of the 2010s. Premiere shows and film festival screenings are not considered as releases for this list.

Assamese language films

References

Assamese
2010s
Assamese